Geriley is a small town in the southwestern Gedo region of Somalia.

Overview
The town originally acquired its name Geriley from the abundant local wildlife; in particular, giraffes ("geri" in the Somali language).

Geriley is situated near Somalia's border with the North Eastern Province, north of Wajir.

Demographics
The town has a diverse population of Somalis, with people from the Somali ethnic group also well represented, especially the [[Marehan [Darod]]].

References

External links
Geriley

Populated places in Gedo